In architecture, an apse (plural apses; from Latin  'arch, vault' from Ancient Greek   'arch'; sometimes written apsis, plural apsides) is a semicircular recess covered with a hemispherical vault or semi-dome, also known as an exedra. In Byzantine, Romanesque, and Gothic Christian church (including cathedral and abbey) architecture, the term is applied to a semi-circular or polygonal termination of the main building at the liturgical east end (where the altar is), regardless of the shape of the roof, which may be flat, sloping, domed, or hemispherical. Smaller apses are found elsewhere, especially in shrines.

Definition
An apse is a semicircular recess, often covered with a hemispherical vault. Commonly, the apse of a church, cathedral or basilica is the semicircular or polygonal termination to the choir or sanctuary, or sometimes at the end of an aisle.

Smaller apses are sometimes built in other parts of the church, especially for reliquaries or shrines of saints.

History
The domed apse became a standard part of the church plan in the early Christian era.

Related features
In the Eastern Orthodox Church tradition, the south apse is known as the diaconicon and the north apse as the prothesis. Various ecclesiastical features of which the apse may form part are drawn together here.

Chancel

The chancel (or sanctuary), directly to the east beyond the choir, contains the high altar, where there is one (compare communion table). This area is reserved for the clergy, and was therefore formerly called the "presbytery", from Greek presbuteros, "elder",  or in older and Catholic usage "priest".

Chevet-apse chapels

Semi-circular choirs, first developed in the East, which came into use in France in 470. By the onset of the 13th century, they had been augmented with radiating apse chapels outside the choir aisle, the entire structure of apse, choir and radiating chapels coming to be known as the chevet (French, "headpiece").

Gallery

See also 
 Ambulatory
 Architectural development of the eastern end of cathedrals in England and France
 Byzantine architecture
 Cathedral architecture
 Church architecture
 Narthex
 Niche
 Scarsella

References 

 Joseph Nechvatal, "Immersive Excess in the Apse of Lascaux", Technonoetic Arts 3, no. 3, 2005.

External links 

  This has a detailed description of examples in the early church.

Arches and vaults
Church architecture